Stefan Gödde (born 12 December 1975) is a German television presenter, radio presenter and reporter.

Biography 
Gödde grew up in Rüthen (Soest). There he attended the Friedrich-Spee-School and completed his Zivildienst. 
After his Abitur in 1995, he studied German studies and English studies at the University of Paderborn and on the Aston University in Birmingham. His first state exam on teaching in Secondary I and II, he finished in December 2001.

His television career began in August 2002 as Dominik Bachmair's successor as host of the business magazine show BIZZ on ProSieben. He then co-hosted the tabloid magazine show taff with Annemarie Carpendale from 2005 to 2009. Since March 2009, he has presented the ProSieben knowledge magazine show Galileo, alternating weekly with Aiman Abdallah. His reports from Chernobyl, and North Korea attracted particular attention.

Filmography

References

External links

  
 

1975 births
Living people
People from Paderborn
German radio presenters
German game show hosts
ProSieben people